Eupithecia impolita is a moth in the family Geometridae. It is found in China (Shansi).

References

Moths described in 1980
impolita
Moths of Asia